Yard Act are a British rock band from Leeds, composed of James Smith (vocals, lyrics), Ryan Needham (bass), Sam Shipstone (guitar) and Jay Russell (drums). Their debut album The Overload was released on 21 January 2022 and debuted at number 2 on the UK Albums Chart.

History
Prior to forming the band, vocalist James Smith and bassist Ryan Needham had both been members of other Leeds-based bands. Smith was a member of Post War Glamour Girls and Needham played in Menace Beach, two bands that released a split EP together in 2016. After the release of the EP, the pair began discussing forming a band together, a plan that eventually came to fruition in September 2019, when the pair moved into a house together in Meanwood. They soon recruited guitarist Sammy Robinson and drummer George Townend who played together in Treeboy & Arc. During this period, Robinson departed from the group, leading to the recruitment of Sam Shipstone. Prior to the announcement of their debut album, the band had only released a total of four singles independently. These singles were then compiled onto an EP, titled Dark Days, released in 2021.

Their debut album The Overload was released on 21 January 2022. The group is "one to watch" in the BBC's Sound of 2022 shortlist. The group was also named one of Paste's "Best New Artists of 2021". On 1 July 2022  a re-recorded version of "100% Endurance" was released featuring a collaboration with Elton John.

Musical style
Critics have categorised the band's music as post-punk and indie rock. Often making use of elements of 1970s Italo disco, ’90s hip-hop and early 2000s indie rock.

Their lyrics are often political, discussing opposition to topics including capitalism, gentrification and social class, told using "dark humor and cynical storytelling". Their lyrics also take a surrealist style, such as on the song Payday from their first album.

Members
Current
James Smith – vocals (2019–present)
Ryan Needham – bass (2019–present)
Sam Shjipstone – guitar (2020–present)
Jay Russell – drums (2020–present)

Former
Sammy Robinson – guitar (2019–2020)
George Townend – drums (2019–2020)

Discography

Studio albums

Extended plays

Singles

Accolades

References

English rock music groups
No wave groups
Island Records artists
Musical groups established in 2019
Musical quartets
Post-punk groups from Leeds
2019 establishments in the United Kingdom
Indie rock groups from Leeds